Ficus kurzii may be called the Burmese banyan: it is an Asian species of fig tree in the family Moraceae.  
No subspecies are listed in the Catalogue of Life; its native range is China (Yunnan) Indo-China and Malesia.  The species can be found in Vietnam: where it may be called Ða Kurz.

Gallery

References

External links 
 
 

Plants described in 1888

kurzii
Trees of Vietnam
Flora of Indo-China
Flora of Malesia